The economy of Grenada is a largely tourism-based, small and open economy. Over the past two decades, the main thrust of Grenada's economy has shifted from agriculture to services, with tourism serving as the leading foreign currency earning sector. The country's principal export crops are the spices nutmeg and mace (Grenada is the world's second largest producer of nutmeg after Indonesia). Other crops for export include cocoa, citrus fruits, bananas, cloves, and cinnamon. Manufacturing industries in Grenada operate mostly on a small scale, including production of beverages and other foodstuffs, textiles, and the assembly of electronic components for export.

Economic growth picked up in the late 1990s following slow growth and domestic fiscal adjustment in early years of the decade. Despite an expansionary fiscal policy, the public debt remained moderate at around 50 percent of GDP as deficits were financed partly by privatization receipts. Since 2001, economic growth declined. The decline was caused by adverse shocks, such as a slowdown in the global economy and natural disasters. To deal with the shocks, fiscal policy became more expansionary, while privatization receipts declined. As a result, public debt increased sharply to near 110 percent of GDP in 2003. Economic conditions worsened when Hurricane Ivan hit the country in September 2004; progress in fiscal consolidation was impeded as government revenues fell and policy priority was shifted to post-hurricane relief.

Although reconstruction has proceeded quickly with significant aid from the international community, tourism and agricultural activities remain weak and nearly offset the stimulus from the reconstruction boom. The country is still facing the difficult task of reconstruction and recovery, while public debt is unsustainable and the government faces large financing gaps. In the years ahead, reinvigorating growth will be a high priority, and continued efforts are needed to address vulnerabilities.

Economic Performance

After experiencing GDP growth averaging nearly six percent a year in the late 1990s, economic growth declined considerably after 2001 as a result of  a decline in the tourism industry following the September 11, 2001, terrorist attacks, and damages caused by several hurricanes.

The economy of Grenada was brought to a near standstill in September 2004 by Hurricane Ivan, which damaged or destroyed 90 percent of the country's buildings, including some tourist facilities. In July 2005 Hurricane Emily struck Grenada again as the country was still recovering from the impact of Hurricane Ivan. Besides the negative impacts to the tourism industry, the two devastating hurricanes destroyed or significantly damaged a large percentage of Grenada's tree crops, which may take years to recover.

As the damage of Hurricane Ivan to the economy exceeded 200 percent of GDP, economic growth registered a negative growth of three percent in 2004, compared with a positive growth rate of 5.8 percent in 2003. Although signs of recovery have been seen in Grenada after the damage inflicted by Hurricanes Ivan and Emily, economic conditions remain difficult; GDP is projected at a growth rate of only one percent for 2005.

With the absence of sustained growth, the fiscal situation started to deteriorate after 2001 reflecting a continued expansionary policy with sharp increase in spending on social sectors, the wage bill, and goods and services. As a result, the fiscal deficit rose to 8.5 percent of GDP in 2001 from 3.2 percent in 2000. The fiscal situation remained shaky in 2002 with the deficit widening to 19.2 percent of GDP due to dampened output from Tropical Storm Lili. As the economic began to recover in 2003, the government began to take steps for fiscal consolidation, and the fiscal deficit fell to 4.8 percent of GDP. But progress in fiscal consolidation was impeded in 2004 as the government policy changed abruptly to post-hurricane relief.  Meanwhile, government revenues decreased as a result of the impact of the hurricanes on the economy.

While economic growth has declined since 2001 due to adverse shocks, including slowdown in the global economy and natural disasters, fiscal policy became more expansionary when privatization receipts declined. As a result, public debt has increased sharply to over 100 percent of GDP since 2002; it remained as high as near 130 percent of GDP in 2004.

Grenada is a member of the Eastern Caribbean Central Bank (ECCB), which manages monetary policy and issues a common currency for all the member countries. Inflation has remained low and stable within the framework of the currency board arrangement, with inflation averaging at two percent over the past 15 years.

Balance of Payments

Grenada's current account balance has remained in large deficit due to its heavy dependence on import of most consumer goods and domestic investment. Following an average deficit of around 44 percent of GDP from 1997 to 2000, the current account deficit has increased to over 35 percent of GDP since 2001 due to higher import demand combined with lower receipts from tourism and nutmeg exports. The current account deficits are financed by inflows of foreign direct investment, official grants and loans, and commercial borrowing by the private sector.
Grenada's economy is vulnerable to external shocks considering its high dependence on tourism, exports, and imports of most of the goods that are consumed or invested domestically. It is also prone to other adverse shocks such as natural disasters.

Regional Situation

In the aftermath of Hurricanes Ivan and Emily, the priority now for Grenada is to continue the recovery process necessary to restore the infrastructure that was devastated by the hurricanes. The international community has disbursed significant amounts of aid, including financial help under the International Monetary Fund's emergency assistance policy for natural disasters and assistance from the World Bank and the Caribbean Development Bank.

In the context of regional economic development, further integration into the Eastern Caribbean regional economy will help enhance Grenada's competitiveness and increase its scale of economy in production, marketing and distribution.

Statistics

GDP:
purchasing power parity - $1.401 billion (2015 est.)

GDP - real growth rate:
4.6% (2015 est.)

GDP - per capita:
purchasing power parity - $13,100 (2015 est.)

GDP - composition by sector:
agriculture: 6.2%
industry: 14.3%
services: 79.5% (2015 est.)

Population below poverty line:
38% (2008 est.)

Household income or consumption by percentage share:
lowest 10%: NA%
highest 10%: NA%

Inflation rate (consumer prices):
1.3% (2015)

Labor force:
59,900 (2013)

Labor force - by occupation:
services 69%, agriculture 11%, industry 20% (2008 est.)

Unemployment rate:
33.5% (2013)

Budget:
revenues: $191.8 million
expenditures: $230.9 million (2012 est)

Industries:
food and beverages, textiles, light assembly operations, tourism, construction

Industrial production growth rate:
-1% (2015 est.)

Electricity - production:
193 GWh (2012 est.)

Electricity - production by source:
fossil fuel: 98.2%
hydro: 0%
nuclear: 0%
other: 1.4% (2012 est.)

Electricity - consumption:
178 GWh (2012 est.)

Electricity - exports:
0 kWh (2013 est.)

Electricity - imports:
0 kWh (2013 est.)

Agriculture - products:
bananas, cocoa, nutmeg, mace, citrus, avocados, root crops, sugarcane, maize, vegetables

Exports:
$43.8 million (2015 est.)

Exports - commodities:
nutmeg, bananas, cocoa, fruit and vegetables, clothing, mace

Exports - partners:
Nigeria 44.7%, St. Lucia 10.8%, Antigua and Barbuda 7.3%, St. Kitts and Nevis 6.6%, Dominica 6.6%, United States 5.8% (2015)

Imports:
$310.4 million (2015 est.)

Imports - commodities:
food, manufactured goods, machinery, chemicals, fuel

Imports - partners:
Trinidad and Tobago 49.6%, United States 16.4% (2015)

Debt - external:
$679 million (2013 est.)

Economic aid - recipient:
$8.3 million (1995)

Currency:
1 East Caribbean dollar (EC$) = 100 cents

Exchange rates:
East Caribbean dollars (EC$) per US$1 – 2.7000 (fixed rate since 1976)

Fiscal year:
calendar year

References

 
Grenada